Mojstrovica (elevation ) is a peak in the western Karawanks in Slovenia. It is accessible from the village of Belca in the Municipality of Kranjska Gora.

References

External links 
 Mojstrovica on Geopedia

Mountains of Upper Carniola
Karawanks
One-thousanders of Slovenia
Mountains of the Alps